The World of Coca-Cola is a museum located in Atlanta, Georgia, United States, showcasing the history of The Coca-Cola Company. The  complex opened to the public on May 24, 2007, relocating from and replacing the original exhibit, which was founded in 1990 in Underground Atlanta. There are various similar World of Coca-Cola stores in locations such as Las Vegas and Disney Springs.

History

Original museum: 1990–2007
The original World of Coca-Cola was located in downtown Atlanta, Georgia, at 55 Martin Luther King Jr Drive, between the Georgia State Capitol and the Underground Atlanta shopping and entertainment district. The museum opened in 1990, and would remain open until 2007. The original World of Coca-Cola saw around nine million visitors during its years of operation, becoming Atlanta's most visited indoor attraction until it was surpassed by the Georgia Aquarium in 2009.

The museum was inspired to serve as a continuation of Coca-Cola history dating back to 1886. During this time, Dr. John S. Pemberton, a pharmacist from Atlanta, created a unique soft drink with a specific flavour syrup that was highly popular. Frank M. Robinson, his partner and bookkeeper, is responsible for the name of Coca-Cola as well as the well-known design of the script.

The museum was located in a three-story pavilion, and its entrance had a huge neon Coca-Cola sign (30 feet high and 26 feet wide). This sign was built by Metals Manufacturing in West Valley, Utah. The tour started on the top floor and worked downwards, featuring approximately 1,000 Coca-Cola artifacts presented in chronological order, interactive exhibits such as a replica 1930s soda fountain, video presentations of Coca-Cola advertising over the years, and a 10-minute film about Coke around the world. The tour featured the 'Spectacular Fountain,' where visitors were allowed to sample various Coke products. At the 'Tastes of the States' area in the same room, guests were able to try 22 different soft drink brands, some available only regionally. 

The 'Tastes of the World' exhibit was located in the International Lounge. There was also a gift shop. The Georgia state government acquired the former World of Coca-Cola building for $1.1 million after Coca-Cola vacated the facility in 2007; state legislators had proposed to install a state history museum in the building, but no action has been taken due to the cost of refurbishing the old World of Coca-Cola building as well as the lack of funding to do so.

Relocation and new facilities: 2007–present

The Atlanta museum was relocated to 121 Baker Street in Atlanta, just blocks away from where John Pemberton created the original Coca-Cola formula. The 92,000-square-foot building was constructed at a cost of $97 million and opened in 2007. It is located in Atlanta, Georgia (where the company's headquarters are located) at Pemberton Place (named in honor of John Pemberton, the inventor of Coca-Cola). The  complex is located across Baker Street from Centennial Olympic Park and is also home to the Georgia Aquarium and the Center for Civil & Human Rights. It opened to the public on May 24, 2007, relocating from and replacing the original exhibit. 

The museum features exhibits about the secret formula of Coca-Cola, a 3D movie where an intrepid scientist and his assistant set out to find the secret for themselves (featuring actors James Meehan and Jameelah Silva), and allows visitors to taste 60 different flavors from around the world. It also houses a fully functional bottling line that produced 8-ounce bottles of Coca-Cola for distribution to its guests. However, citing operation costs, since 2013, the plant runs in simulation as such practice was discontinued.

Non-Atlanta locations

There are other World of Coca-Cola locations beyond Atlanta as well. Club Cool, formerly Ice Station Cool, is located in Walt Disney World's Epcot park. When it was called Ice Station Cool, the facade was themed to resemble a polar expedition with props such as a snowmobile. Like other Coca-Cola exhibits, it included an area where guests could taste Coca-Cola beverages from around the world. In 2016, the World of Coca-Cola opened in Disney Springs, which was modelled like the Atlanta attraction. It features a sampling of Coca-Cola products from around the world.

 World of Coca-Cola Las Vegas, built in 1997, was located in the Showcase Mall on the Las Vegas Strip. It closed in 2000, but the Everything Coca-Cola store remains open. World of Coca-Cola Tokyo was located on the 6th floor of Mediage in Odaiba. It closed on January 15, 2007. There is also a Coca-Cola Museum in Taoyuan City, Taiwan as of 2007.

Gallery
Old Atlanta, Georgia location

Current Atlanta, Georgia location

See also

 Coca-Cola Museum
 List of food and beverage museums
 List of Coca-Cola buildings and structures
 List of Coca-Cola slogans
 Tourism in Atlanta

References

External links

 World of Coca-Cola Atlanta website
 World of Coca-Cola from Roadside Georgia

Drinks museums in the United States
Coca-Cola buildings and structures
Industry museums in Georgia (U.S. state)
Museums established in 1990
Museums in Atlanta
1990 establishments in Georgia (U.S. state)